T. salicifolia may refer to:
 Tetrataxis salicifolia, a plant species endemic to Mauritius
 Tournefortia salicifolia DC., a plant species in the genus Tournefortia

See also
 Salicifolia (disambiguation)